C91 may refer to :
 Ruy Lopez chess openings ECO code
 Lymphoid leukemia ICD-10 code
 Brun C91, a 1991 sports prototype racing car built for Group C
 Dowagiac Municipal Airport in Dowagiac, Michigan FAA LID
 Paid Vacations (Seafarers) Convention (Revised), 1949 (shelved) code
 C91FM, a former branding name for Christchurch New Zealand radio C93FM
 Zenithink ZT280 Tablet PC
 Caldwell 91 (NGC 3532), an open cluster in the constellation Carina